Chakar may refer to:
 Chakar Ali Khan Junejo, ambassador of Pakistan to the United Arab Emirates
 Mir Chakar Rind, Baloch chieftain in the 15th century
 Chakar, Iran (disambiguation)
 Shahpur Chakar, small town in Pakistan
 Chakar, Punjab, town in Punjab, India: (ਚਕਰ) Chakar, Ludhiana, Punjab 142035

See also
 Chaker (disambiguation)
 Chakhar (disambiguation)